Saw Hnit (also spelled စောနစ်, Saw Nit or Min Lulin; 1283–1325) was a viceroy of Pagan (Bagan) from 1297 to 1325 under the suzerain of Myinsaing Kingdom in central Burma (Myanmar). He was a son of the Mongol vassal king Kyawswa, and a grandson of Narathihapate, the last sovereign king of Pagan dynasty. Saw Hnit succeeded as "king" after his father was forced to abdicate the throne by the three brothers of Myinsaing in December 1297.

The brothers put him on the throne, officially styled as the king of Pagan, but essentially their viceroy. His authority amounted to the region around the Pagan city. The viceroy gave his first audience on 8 May 1299. He raised his father's chief queen Saw Thitmahti as his own chief queen. Two days later, the three brothers executed his brother Theingapati and his father Kyawswa.

King Swa Saw Ke of Ava (r. 1367–1400) was a grandnephew of Saw Hnit.

Dates
Saw Hnit was a son of King Kyawswa. The table below lists the dates given by the four main chronicles.

Ancestry
The following is the ancestry of Saw Hnit as reported by the Hmannan Yazawin chronicle (Hmannan Vol. 1 2003: 360, 402–403). He was descended from Pagan kings from both sides. His parents were second cousins, once removed.

Notes

References

Bibliography
 
 
 
 
 
 

Pagan dynasty
13th-century Burmese people
14th-century Burmese people